Trichostegia is a genus of insects belonging to the family Phryganeidae.

The species of this genus are found in Europe and Northern America.

Species:
 Trichostegia minor (Curtis, 1834)

References

Phryganeidae
Trichoptera genera